Antônio Fialho de Carvalho Neto (born 11 September 2002), commonly known as Neto, is a Brazilian footballer who plays for Chapecoense, on loan from Atlético Mineiro, either as a defensive midfielder or a right-back.

Neto joined Atlético's youth ranks in 2015 and made his professional debut on 23 January 2019, aged 16, in a Campeonato Mineiro 1–0 defeat to Tombense. He played for the Brazil U17s at the 2019 South American Championship.

Career statistics

Club

Notes

Honours
Atlético Mineiro
Campeonato Brasileiro Série A: 2021
Copa do Brasil: 2021
Campeonato Mineiro: 2021, 2022
Supercopa do Brasil: 2022

References

2002 births
Living people
Brazilian footballers
Brazil youth international footballers
Association football defenders
Association football midfielders
Clube Atlético Mineiro players
Associação Chapecoense de Futebol players